United Nations Security Council Resolution 319, adopted on August 1, 1972, after reaffirming previous resolutions on the topic, the Council invited the Secretary-General, in consultation with the group established in resolution 309, to continue to contact all concerned parties and establish the necessary conditions to allow the people to exercise their right to self-determination in accordance with the Charter.  The Council then requested the Secretary-General keep them informed on the implementation of resolution 309.

Resolution 319 was adopted unanimously with 14 votes; the People's Republic of China did not participate in voting.

See also
 List of United Nations Security Council Resolutions 301 to 400 (1971–1976)
 South West Africa

References 
Text of the Resolution at undocs.org

External links
 

 0319
 0319
 0319
August 1972 events